Coole is a village in County Westmeath, Ireland, on the R395 regional road. It is situated on a plateau that overlooks the part of the Bog of Allen, cultivated for peat for fuel consumption purposes by Bórd na Móna, the government-owned peat production industry and for garden plant soil compost products by Harte Peat Ltd., a private enterprise, and Bórd na Móna.

The village is stretched over a series of junctions and cross-roads. These regional and communal roads connect to Castlepollard to the east, Coolure, near Lough Derravaragh to the south, and Abbeylara to the north-west in neighbouring County Longford. Another communal road accesses and crosses the low-lying bog-land, permitting machinery access to the area.

The village consists of a pub, a post office, a shop, a church, and a medical centre. There is also a primary school and a parish community hall.

Coole is the birthplace of Lt. Maurice James Dease VC, the first posthumous recipient of the Victoria Cross in the Great War at the Battle of Mons.

References

Towns and villages in County Westmeath